Dinner Time (1928) is an American animated short subject produced by Amadee J. Van Beuren, directed by Paul Terry, co-directed by John Foster, and produced at Van Beuren Studios. Josiah Zuro arranged and conducted the "synchronized" music score. The film is part of a series entitled Aesop's Fables and features the Terry creation Farmer Al Falfa who works as a butcher, fending off a group of pesky dogs.

Dinner Time was one of the first publicly shown sound-on-film cartoons. It premiered at the Strand Theater New York City in August 1928 (according to the August 22 edition Film Daily) and released by Pathé Exchange on October 14, 1928, a month before Walt Disney's sound cartoon, Steamboat Willie. Dinner Time was not successful with audiences and Disney's film would be widely touted as the first synchronized sound cartoon.

Max and Dave Fleischer released 36 cartoons in their Song Car-Tunes series—with about 19 of those made in the DeForest Phonofilm sound-on-film system—between May 1924 and September 1926.

See also
Phonofilm
Sound film

References

External links

1928 films
1928 animated films
1920s American animated films
1920s animated short films
Aesop's Fables (film series)
American animated short films
American black-and-white films
Terrytoons shorts
Van Beuren Studios
Films directed by Paul Terry